The 1980–81 Montreal Canadiens season was the club's 72nd season of play. The Canadiens lost just once in their last twenty-seven home games. The Canadiens earned at least 100 regular season points for the seventh consecutive season. Montreal qualified for the playoffs and were eliminated in the NHL's Preliminary round by the Edmonton Oilers three games to none. Four days after the Canadiens were eliminated, head coach Claude Ruel resigned.

Offseason

Regular season
 Guy Lafleur appeared in only 51 games and scored 27 goals. It was the first time since the 1973–74 Montreal Canadiens season that he failed to score 50 goals or more in a season.

Final standings

Schedule and results

Playoffs
The Canadiens were swept in three games by the Edmonton Oilers. In Game One of the series, Wayne Gretzky had five assists. This was a single game playoff record.

Player statistics

Regular season
Scoring

Goaltending

Playoffs
Scoring

Goaltending

Awards and records

Transactions

Draft picks
The 1980 NHL Entry Draft was hosted at the Montreal Forum. It would mark the first time that an NHL Arena hosted the event.

Farm teams

See also
 1980–81 NHL season

References

Montreal Canadiens seasons
Montreal Canadiens season, 1980-81
Norris Division champion seasons
Montreal
Montreal Canadiens
Montreal Canadiens
Eastern Conference (NHL) championship seasons